Sierra Vista Regional Medical Center is a 164-bed tertiary acute-care hospital in San Luis Obispo, California, United States. . It is owned by Tenet Healthcare Corporation.

The hospital is a Level III Trauma Center and offers a range of other services, including neurosurgery, mechanical thrombectomy, a high risk pregnancy program, the only dedicated pediatric unit in San Luis Obispo County and the only NICU in San Luis Obispo County.

The hospital is accredited by the Joint Commission on the Accreditation of Healthcare Organizations.

References

External links
 Official site
 This hospital in the CA Healthcare Atlas A project by OSHPD

Hospitals in California
Buildings and structures in San Luis Obispo, California
Tenet Healthcare
Trauma centers